The Herzegovina uprising was an uprising led by the Christian Serb population against the Ottoman Empire, firstly and predominantly in Herzegovina (hence its name), from where it spread into Bosnia and Raška. It broke out in the summer of 1875, and lasted in some regions up to the beginning of 1878. It was followed by the Bulgarian Uprising of 1876, and coincided with Serbian-Turkish wars (1876–1878), all of those events being part of the Great Eastern Crisis (1875–1878).

The uprising was precipitated by the harsh treatment under the beys and aghas of the Ottoman province (vilayet) of Bosniathe reforms announced by the Ottoman Sultan Abdülmecid I, involving new rights for Christian subjects, a new basis for army conscription and an end to the much-hated system of tax-farming were either resisted or ignored by the powerful Bosnian landowners. They frequently resorted to more repressive measures against their Christian subjects. The tax burden on Christian peasants constantly increased.

The rebels were aided with weapons and volunteers from the principalities of Montenegro and Serbia, whose governments eventually jointly declared war on the Ottomans on 18 June 1876, leading to the Serbian-Ottoman War (1876–78) and Montenegrin–Ottoman War (1876–78), which in turn led to the Russo-Turkish War (1877–78) and Great Eastern Crisis. A result of the uprisings and wars was the Berlin Congress in 1878, which gave Montenegro and Serbia independence and more territory, while Austro-Hungary occupied Bosnia and Herzegovina for 30 years, although it remained de jure Ottoman territory.

Background
In the early 19th century, most of the Balkans was under Ottoman rule. Christian communities of Serbs and Greeks, under Ottoman control for four centuries, rose up and succeeded in obtaining autonomy by means of the Serbian Revolution of 1804–17 and Greek War of Independence of 1821–29, establishing the Principality of Serbia and the Hellenic Republic. The weakened Ottoman central powers was evident in separatist provincial lords (pashas) as seen in Pazvantoğlu, Ali Pasha, Gradaščević (who led a Bosnian bey rebellion in 1831–32) and Muhammad Ali. Ottoman Sultan Mahmud II succeeded in abolishing the problematic Janissaries in 1826, in his reform work. Beginning in the 1830s, the Ottoman Empire seemed to many European observers to be on the verge on collapsing.

The tax-paying lower class (rayah, made up of Christian and Muslim peasants) in the Bosnia Vilayet of the Ottoman Empire experienced harsh economic conditions in the previous century. Bosnian Muslim beys sometimes took as much as half of each peasant's crop annually, besides various taxes on farm products and animals for which Christian peasants were responsible. Furthermore, tax farmers (mütesellim) levied additional taxes on the remaining yield. The failure of the 1874 crop and plight of peasants and external influence in Pan-Slavism and Pan-Serbism and also Austrian aspirations on further South Slavic lands were leading causes of the ensuing rebellion.

Other notable preceding Serb peasant rebellions in the region were the Herzegovina Uprising (1852–62) and Pecija's First Revolt (1858).

Preparations

In Herzegovina
The Serbian leaders of the people of Herzegovina: Jovan Gutić, Simun Zečević, Ilija Stevanović, Trivko Grubačić, Prodan Rupar and Petar Radović, at the end of August and beginning of September 1874, met and decided to start preparing a rebellion. They began collecting weapons and ammunition and establishing safe-places. With the assistance of Montenegro in the uprising, it was to begin in springtime 1875.  The group entered in talks with Montenegrin ruler Nikola I Petrović, but he was unwilling to break and risk the unreadiness of Russia in its war with the Ottomans. The preparations continued; and in Bileća and Trebinje region, serdar Todor Mujičić, Gligor Milićević, Vasilj Svorcan and Sava Jakšić lead the revolt in these regions. Lazar Sočica led the Piva tribe in Old Herzegovina.

The Ottomans heard of the talks between Nikola I and tried to capture the ringleaders, who fled into Montenegro in the winter of 1874. In 1875, Austria was drawn in, who with its interests in Bosnia and Herzegovina, asked the Ottomans to give the ringleaders amnesty. The Ottomans agreed to enter discussions with Austria.

In Bosnia
The preparations started somewhat later than the Herzegovinian and did not manage to coordinate actions of the two regions. In the preparations are Vaso Vidović, Simo and Jovo Bilbija, Spasoje Babić and Vaso Pelagić. The plans began with firstly liberating the villages of Kozara; Prosara and Motajica, then attacking the communications and blocking the cities of the Sava river, later to take over Banja Luka. The start of the uprising was envisaged on 18 August 1875. The Ottomans imprisoned priests in Prijedor, which put further pressure on the people, therefore villagers from Dvorište, Čitluka, Petrinje, Bačvani, Pobrđani and Tavija attacked the Turks in Dvorište on 15 August. The uprising sparked wide; and the leader of the uprising was chosen to be Ostoja Kormanoš.

Uprising in Herzegovina

Gabela
The Catholic population in the Gabela area suffered the difficult living conditions in what was then Turkey.
According to some historians, rebellion in the Gabela area started on 19 June 1875, while according to Noel Malcolm it started on 3 July 1875. British consul in Sarajevo, William Holmes, on 9 July 1875 reported that a "band" of rebels, had blocked the bridge over the Krupa river and road between Metković and Mostar. In Trebinje was gathered about 2,000 Catholic and Orthodox participants and they selected Fr. Ivan Musić as leader of the uprising. Dervish Pasha, governor-general of Bosnia and Herzegovina at that time, claim that both Catholics and Orthodox took part in the revolt. According to a correspondent for the Times in Herzegovina, William James Stillman, violence in Herzegovina started as a revolt of "the Catholic population between Popovo and Gabela" who "anticipated an Austrian intervention" and he also observed that Catholics at that time were "the most enthusiastic in the revolt". Soon new conflicts erupted in northern Bosnia and a large number of people fled to Croatia and Montenegro. By the end of 1876, the number of refugees from Bosnia and Herzegovina was between 100,000 and perhaps 250,000 people. According to Richard C. Hall, 150,000 people fled to Croatia.

Nevesinje

The leaders returned in 1875 and continued their plans for revolt, the plan was for the liberation of Nevesinje region, then expansion to the rest of Herzegovina. In the meantime, Turks seek hajduk Pera Tunguz, who on 5 July, had attacked a caravan on Bišini mountain. On 9 July, the Turks clashed with the armed villagers of Jovan Gutić on the Gradac hill north of Krekovi. This conflict would be known in Serbian as Nevesinjska puška ("Nevesinje rifle") and marked the beginning of the uprising in all of Herzegovina. Firstly Nevesinje, Bileća and Stolac were involved, then in August, Gacko and the frontier towards Montenegro. Bands (known as četa) of 50–300 people and detachments of 500–2,000 people gathered and attacked Ottoman border posts and bey towers.

The Ottomans had 4 battalions of the regular army (Nizami) with a total of 1,800 soldiers, situated in Mostar, Trebinje, Nikšić, Foča and the border posts, also a larger number of başıbozuk were present all over the province. The Ottoman troops were commanded by Selim Pasha (Selim-paša) who in turn is under Dervish Pasha (Derviš-paša), the commander of the Bosnia Vilayet. After the outbreak of the uprising, the Turks tried to gain time by starting negotiations while reinforcements arrived. The rebels wanted lower taxes, which the Turks refused, and the fighting continued. In August, 4,000 Nizami arrived from Bosnia, and later 4 more battalions by sea through Klek in Trebinje. The rebels had by July and August destroyed the majority of border posts and besieged Trebinje by 5 August. The Turks regained Trebinje by 30 August. In the end of August, fighting broke out in Bosnia, and Serbia and Montenegro promised aid, sparking an intensification of the uprising.

Prince Nikola sent Petar Vukotić, while a large number of Montenegrin volunteers arrived at the command of Peko Pavlović. The Serbian government dared not to publicly assist because of international pressure but secretly sent Mićo Ljubibratić (who took part in the 1852–1862 uprising) among others. There was a conflict between the rebels because of disagreement between the representatives of the Montenegrin and Serbian governments, causing failures in the ongoing uprising.

Many Europeans took part in the uprising with the idea of bringing down Muslim rule over Christians (mainly Italians, former Garibaldinians).

Uprising in Bosnia
 
According to Herr Fritz, the Serb rebels were "extremely numerous and in some cases well armed" and were divided among following troops and bands:
Risovac and Grmeč, in West Bosnia, under the leadership of well-known Golub Babić, Marinković, Simo Davidović, Pop-Karan and Trifko Amelić. The Serbian colonel Mileta Despotović held supreme leadership and had formed 8 battalions out of the scattered bands.
Vučjak, in East Bosnia.
Pastirevo and Kozara, in North Bosnia, bands led by Marko Djenadija, Ostoja, Spasojević, Marko Bajalica, hegumen Hadzić and Pop-Stevo. The new camp of Brezovac, not far from Novi, was held by Ostoja Vojnović. The former camp of Karađorđevići in Ćorkovac was held by Ilija Sević.

The aim of the Bosnian rebel bands was to prevent any greater concentration of Ottoman troops on the Drina, which was the western frontier of Serbia. As a systemically organised insurrection in Bosnia was impossible, the rebels pursued and drove back the "Turk" (Muslim) population into their towns. The bands protected and helped the exiles into hiding in the woods and leading unarmed men, women and children, to reach the frontier of Austria or Serbia through safe conduct.

According to Mackenzie and Irby who travelled the region in 1877, the state of the common Christian people was serious, and the number of fugitives exceeded 200,000 all round the frontier by January 1877.

The rebels in South Bosnia had cleared the region of Muslims, presently under the command of Despotović, between the Austrian frontier and the Ottoman fortresses of Kulen Vakuf, Ključ and Glamoč.

In August 1877, all Bosnian Muslims men from 15 to 70 were ordered to fight, although there was already 54 battalions, each with 400–700 men.

Aftermath

The uprising was the starting point of the Great Eastern Crisis, the reopening of the "Eastern Question". The unrest rapidly spread among the Christian populations of the other Ottoman provinces in the Balkans (notably the April Uprising in Bulgaria) setting off what would become known as the Great Eastern Crisis. The Ottoman atrocities in suppressing unrest in the Balkan provinces eventually led to the Russo-Turkish War of 1877–78, which ended in Turkish defeat, and the signing of the Treaty of San Stefano in March 1878, followed in July of the same year by the Treaty of Berlin, severely reducing Ottoman territories and power in Europe. The Congress of Berlin decided that Bosnia and Herzegovina, while remaining nominally under Turkish sovereignty, would be governed by Austria-Hungary.  Austria-Hungary annexed Bosnia and Herzegovina in 1908.  The occupation and annexation enraged Serbs and was a catalyst for the assassination of Archduke Franz Ferdinand of Austria by the Bosnian Serb nationalist Gavrilo Princip.

Legacy

The Nevesinje municipality has a coat of arms with two rifles, symbolising the revolt. The government of Republika Srpska together with the Nevesinje municipality annually organises the anniversary of the revolt.

In 1963, a Yugoslav film by Žika Mitrović about the Nevesinje rebellion was released, titled in Serbian as Невесињска пушка and in English as Thundering Mountains.

Jovan Bratić (born 1974), a comic artist from Nevesinje, made a cartoon series on the Herzegovina Uprising, titled Nevesinjska puška, the first part released in 2008, and the second part Nevesinjska puška 2: Bitka na Vučjem dolu.

According to historian Edin Radušić "Milorad Ekmečić gave the main word in interpretations of a wide range of issues related to the uprising in domestic historiography, in the 1960s he from Vaso Čubrilović took over the primacy as the main interpreter of the uprising, and since then he had the greatest influence on other historians who have dealt with this thematic framework".  Also, "Ekmečić became more openly politically engaged in recent works, openly linking the motives of the 19th century uprising with the insurgent movements from WWII and violence in Bosnia and Herzegovina from the end of the 20th century, with the thesis of religious war as the appearance of the long duration, which has one of its key episodes in the uprising of 1875–1878".

See also
 Herzegovina Vilayet
 Austro-Hungarian campaign in Bosnia and Herzegovina in 1878

References

Sources

External links

Rebellions in Bosnia and Herzegovina
Ottoman period in the history of Bosnia and Herzegovina
Conflicts in 1875
Conflicts in 1876
Conflicts in 1877
Great Eastern Crisis
History of Herzegovina
History of the Serbs of Bosnia and Herzegovina
1870s in Europe
1870s in the Ottoman Empire
19th century in Bosnia and Herzegovina
Ottoman–Serbian Wars
Serb rebellions against the Ottoman Empire
19th-century rebellions
Battles involving Serbia
Battles involving Montenegro